Ridin' Down the Canyon is a 1942 American Western film directed by Joseph Kane and starring Roy Rogers. Members of the Western Writers of America chose its title song as one of the Top 100 Western songs of all time, ranked 97.

Plot summary 
Bobbie Blake has three big loves in his life; his sister, their wild horse business and listening to Roy Rogers and the Sons of the Pioneers on the radio. When rustlers steal their recently acquired horses prior to their sale Bobbie runs away from home to get Roy and the Sons of the Pioneers to track down the rustlers and bring them to justice. Though Roy and his friends are radio entertainers, Bobbie's desire for justice can't be stopped. Fate allows his heroes to bring the rustlers to justice, especially as the leader of the rustlers uses Roy's radio show to secretly broadcast instructions to his gang.

Cast 
Roy Rogers as Roy Rogers
George "Gabby" Hayes as Gabby
Bob Nolan as Bob Nolan, (Leader, Sons of the Pioneers)
Sons of the Pioneers as Musicians
Robert "Buzz" Henry as Bobbie Blake
Linda Hayes as Alice Blake
Addison Richards as Gus Jordan
Lorna Gray as Barbara Joyce
Olin Howland as The Jailer
James Seay as Burt Wooster
Hal Taliaferro as Henchman Pete
Forrest Taylor as Jim Fellowes
Roy Barcroft as Henchman
Pat Brady as Pat Brady

Soundtrack 
 Sons of the Pioneers - "Sagebrush Symphony" (Written by Tim Spencer)
 Sons of the Pioneers - "Curly Joe From Idaho" (Written by Tim Spencer and Roy Rogers)
 Roy Rogers and the Sons of the Pioneers - "Blue Prairie" (Written by Bob Nolan and Tim Spencer)
 Roy Rogers and the Sons of the Pioneers - "My Little Buckaroo" (Written by Jack Scholl and M.K. Jerome)
 Lorna Gray - "Who Am I?" (Written by Walter Bullock and Jule Styne)
 Roy Rogers - "In A Little Spanish Town" (Written by Sam Lewis, Joe Young and Mabel Wayne)
 Roy Rogers and the Sons of the Pioneers - "Ridin' Down the Canyon" (Written by Smiley Burnette)

References

External links 

1942 films
1942 Western (genre) films
American black-and-white films
Republic Pictures films
American Western (genre) films
Films directed by Joseph Kane
1940s English-language films
1940s American films